Liu Xue'an (刘雪庵 1905–1985), whose pen names were Yan Ru (晏如), Wu Qing (吴青), and Su Ya (苏崖) was a Chinese composer. Among his best known songs include "The Great Wall Ballad"; 1936), "When Will You Return?," and "Red Bean Poem"《红豆词》.

He taught at the Sunan College of Education in Suzhou, the music department of the East China University in Shanghai and at the Arts Normal College and the Conservatory of Chinese.

Liu was criticized and suffered during the Anti-Rightist Movement in 1957 and during the Cultural Revolution in the 1960s.  He offered a public self-criticism in 1980 before he was rehabilitated, however criticism of his song "When Will You Return?" continued in mainland China for some time as an example of "Yellow Music", a product of decadent and immoral society.

References

1905 births
1985 deaths
20th-century Chinese musicians
20th-century composers
Male composers
Chinese composers
Chinese music educators
Academic staff of the East China Normal University
China Conservatory of Music
Academic staff of the Central Conservatory of Music
Academic staff of Soochow University (Suzhou)
20th-century Chinese educators
20th-century male musicians